Kadri Aytaç (6 August 1931 – 28 March 2003) was a former Turkish football player and then manager. He played for the Beyoğluspor, Karagümrük, Galatasaray, Fenerbahçe and Mersin İdmanyurdu teams. He is the manager with the most titles earned in the Turkish Second Football League, having in the process promoted four teams to the Turkish First Football League.

Player career
In the 1958–59 season, Aytaç was the first expensive transfer, when he was transferred from Galatasaray to Karagümrük for TL 57.000. On 25 February 1959, he made the first penalty kick in Karagümrük-Vefa match and became the first player who missed a penalty in Turkish first division started in 1959. During his playing career, he won league title for two times in 1961 with Fenerbahçe and in 1963 with Galatasaray.

Aytaç was capped in Turkish national football team for 26 times.

He was among the captains of Mersin idmanyurdu football team. In 1966–67 he was transferred to a second division team Mersin İdmanyurdu which promoted to first division at the end of that season. He played for Mersin İdmanyurdu in 1967–68 and 1968–69 seasons in first division, Turkish First Football League. After 1968–69 season he gave up professional football. In his jubilee match Mersin İdmanyurdu played against a celebrities' team.

Manager career
After his player career Kadri Aytaç started his manager career. In 1968–69 season he was the manager of Mersin İdmanyurdu youth team when he was playing in A team. Before the start of the 1969–70 season Kadri Aytaç became the technical advisor of Mersin İdmanyurdu and look for foreign transfers. Later he attended a course in Romania. Later in that season Aytaç became the manager of Denizlispor, then second division team. He managed Mersin İdmanyurdu in 1975–76, 1976–77 and 1992–93 seasons. in 1975–76 he made Mersin İdmanyurdu champions in second division, Turkish Second Football League. In 1976–77 Mersin İdmanyurdu became 7th of First League. In 1992–93, Mersin İdmanyurdu was 5th of the promotion group of Second League.

Among the teams he managed other than Mersin İdmanyurdu are, Orduspor, Gençlerbirliği, İstanbulspor, Tirespor, Rizespor, Kayserispor, Ankaragücü, and Karşıyaka. He helped Mersin İdmanyurdu, Orduspor, Gençlerbirliği and İstanbulspor promote to First League. Under his management Tirespor promoted to second league and then became 3rd in second league next year. He lastly managed Nişantaşıspor in 1997

Personal
He was married to Akgül and had a daughter, Güngör. He died at age 71 due to Alzheimer's disease from which he suffered in last five years of his life He rests at the  Feriköy Cemetery.

References

External links
 
 

Turkish footballers
Turkish football managers
Turkey international footballers
Fenerbahçe S.K. footballers
Galatasaray S.K. footballers
Galatasaray S.K. (football) managers
Süper Lig players
Mersin İdman Yurdu managers
Göztepe S.K. managers
2003 deaths
1931 births
Footballers from Istanbul
1954 FIFA World Cup players
Association football midfielders
Karşıyaka S.K. managers
İstanbulspor managers
Deaths from dementia in Turkey
Deaths from Alzheimer's disease
Burials at Feriköy Cemetery